Ali Marwi is a former Kuwaiti footballer. He prominently played during the early-to-late 1990s with the Kuwaiti national football team as a forward.  He spent most of his career with Kuwait giants Al-Salmiya. He competed in the men's tournament at the 1992 Summer Olympics.

Career
Marwi has had a long career, with the national team and made appearances in several Gulf Cups. In 1992, Ali Marwi scored one goal in the U.A.E. net, as well as another in the Saudi net.  During the 1994 competition, Ali also scored one goal against the Qatari national team.

Ali Marwi also spent a short time at Omani giants Dhofar in 1999, and scored the winning goal against rivals Al-Nasr (Salalah) in the final of the Sultan Qaboos Cup.

Club career statistics

References

External links
 

Living people
Kuwaiti footballers
Olympic footballers of Kuwait
Al Salmiya SC players
Al-Ahli Saudi FC players
Dhofar Club players
1969 births
Association football forwards
Footballers at the 1992 Summer Olympics
Saudi Professional League players
Expatriate footballers in Saudi Arabia
Asian Games bronze medalists for Kuwait
Asian Games medalists in football
Footballers at the 1990 Asian Games
Footballers at the 1994 Asian Games
Medalists at the 1994 Asian Games
Expatriate footballers in Oman
Kuwait Premier League players
Oman Professional League players
Kuwaiti expatriate sportspeople in Oman
Kuwaiti expatriate sportspeople in Saudi Arabia
Kuwaiti expatriate footballers